Lucasfilm Ltd. LLC is an American film and television production company, founded by filmmaker George Lucas in 1971 in San Rafael, California; most of the company's operations were moved to San Francisco in 2005. It is a subsidiary of Walt Disney Studios, a division of Disney Entertainment, which is owned by The Walt Disney Company. The studio is best known for creating and producing the Star Wars and Indiana Jones franchises, as well as its leadership in developing special effects, sound, and computer animation for films.

Star Wars: Episode I – The Phantom Menace (1999), Star Wars: The Force Awakens (2015), Rogue One: A Star Wars Story (2016), Star Wars: The Last Jedi (2017) and Star Wars: The Rise of Skywalker (2019) are all among the 50 highest-grossing films of all time, with Star Wars: The Force Awakens becoming the highest-grossing film in the United States and Canada. Disney acquired Lucasfilm on October 30, 2012, for $4.05 billion in the form of cash and stock, with $1.855 billion in stock.

History

Independent era (1971–2012)
Lucasfilm was founded by filmmaker George Lucas in 1971, and incorporated as Lucasfilm Ltd. on September 12, 1977. In the mid-1970s, the company's offices were located on the Universal Studios Lot. Lucas founded the Star Wars Corporation, Inc. as a subsidiary to control various legal and financial aspects of Star Wars (1977), including copyright, and sequel and merchandising rights. It also produced the 1978 Star Wars Holiday Special for 20th Century Fox Television. That year, Lucas hired Los Angeles-based real-estate specialist Charles Weber to manage the company, telling him that he could keep the job as long as he made money. Lucas wanted the focus of the company to be making independent films, but the company gradually became enlarged from five employees to almost 100, increasing in middle management and running up costs. In 1980, after Weber asked Lucas for fifty million dollars to invest in other companies and suggested that they sell Skywalker Ranch to do so, Lucas fired Weber and had to let half of the Los Angeles staff go. By the same year, the corporate subsidiary had been discontinued and its business was absorbed into the various divisions of Lucasfilm.

Between 1981 and 1989, three Indiana Jones films, written by Lucas and directed by Steven Spielberg, were released. While Return of the Jedi (1983) was in production, Lucas decided not to pursue further Star Wars films. Unhappy with the cinema presentation of Return of the Jedi, he created the company THX, which was unveiled on May 20, 1983. Lucasfilm produced the John Korty-directed animated film Twice Upon a Time (1983). 1985 saw the release of Paul Schrader's Mishima: A Life in Four Chapters. The next year, Jim Henson's Labyrinth and an adaptation of Marvel Comics' Howard the Duck were released. Ron Howard directed the fantasy film Willow in 1988 (written by Lucas); the same year the children's animated film The Land Before Time was released. In 1992, after viewing an early computer-generated imagery test created by Industrial Light & Magic for Jurassic Park, Lucas announced his intentions to produce a Star Wars Prequel Trilogy. In 1994, the long-delayed Radioland Murders (written by Lucas) was released. In 1995, Lucas began production on the prequel trilogy. The trilogy took 10 years to make, ending with the release of the third prequel Star Wars: Episode III – Revenge of the Sith in 2005. In addition to the prequels, Lucas released the Special Editions for the Star Wars Original Trilogy in 1997, 2004 and 2011, for VHS, DVD and Blu-ray.

In 1987, the company, which at that time, was expanding from three to five films a year on its own, decided to increase making its Northern California production facilities available to other filmmakers. In 1989, Lucasfilm launched a new subsidiary Lucasfilm Entertainment Group (later LucasArts Entertainment Company) in order to consolidate all four units, which are Industrial Light & Magic, Lucasfilm Commercial Productions, Lucasfilm Games, and Sprocket Systems.

In 2005, Lucasfilm opened a new studio in Singapore. That same year, Lucasfilm Animation commenced production of a 3D animated Star Wars television series called Star Wars: The Clone Wars, with key production team members including executive producer Catherine Winder, supervising director Dave Filoni, Head of Lucasfilm Animation Singapore Chris Kubsch, and Henry Gilroy. Primary production took place at Lucasfilm Animation's Singapore studio. Airing on Cartoon Network between 2008 and 2013, The Clone Wars was well received by fans and was nominated for several film awards including the Daytime Emmy Awards and the Annie Awards.

In January 2012, Lucas announced his retirement from producing large-scale blockbuster films and instead re-focusing his career on smaller, independently budgeted features. In June 2012, it was announced that Kathleen Kennedy, a long-term collaborator with Steven Spielberg and a producer of the Indiana Jones films, had been appointed as co-chair of Lucasfilm Ltd. It was reported that Kennedy would work alongside Lucas, who would remain chief executive and serve as co-chairman for at least one year, after which she would succeed him as the company's chairperson, which she did in June 2013.

On July 8, 2012, Lucasfilm's marketing, online, and licensing units moved into the new Letterman Digital Arts Center located in the Presidio in San Francisco. It shares the complex with Industrial Light & Magic. Lucasfilm had planned an expansion at Skywalker Ranch in Marin County, California, but shelved the plan in 2012 due to opposition from neighbors. However, it still plans to expand elsewhere. Skywalker Sound remains the only Lucasfilm division based at Skywalker Ranch.

On September 5, 2012, Micheline Chau, who served as president and COO of Lucasfilm for two decades, announced that she was retiring. With her departure, senior executives for each of the Lucasfilm divisions would report directly to Kathleen Kennedy. Chau was credited with keeping the Lucasfilm and Star Wars brands strong, especially through animation spin-offs and licensing initiatives.

Subsidiary of The Walt Disney Studios (2012–present)

Acquisition process
Discussions relating to the possibility of The Walt Disney Company signing a distribution deal with Lucasfilm officially began in May 2011, after a meeting that George Lucas had with the then Disney CEO Bob Iger during the inauguration of the Star Tours – The Adventures Continue attraction. Lucas told Iger he was considering retirement and planned to sell the company, as well as the Star Wars and Indiana Jones franchises. On October 30, 2012, Disney announced a deal to acquire Lucasfilm for $4.05 billion, with approximately half in cash and half in shares of Disney stock. Lucasfilm had previously collaborated with the company's Walt Disney Imagineering division to create theme park attractions centered on Star Wars and Indiana Jones for various Walt Disney Parks and Resorts worldwide.

Kathleen Kennedy, co-chairwoman of Lucasfilm, became president of Lucasfilm, reporting to Walt Disney Studios Chairman Alan Horn. Additionally, she serves as the brand manager for Star Wars, working directly with Disney's global lines of business to build, further integrate, and maximize the value of this global franchise. Kennedy serves as producer on new Star Wars feature films, with George Lucas originally announced as serving as a creative consultant. The company also announced the future release of new Star Wars films, starting with Episode VII: The Force Awakens in 2015.

Under the deal, Disney acquired ownership of Star Wars, Indiana Jones, and Lucasfilm's operating businesses in live-action film production, consumer products, video games, animation, visual effects, and audio post-production. Disney also acquired Lucasfilm's portfolio of entertainment technologies. The intent was for Lucasfilm employees to remain in their current locations. Star Wars merchandising would begin under Disney in the fiscal year 2014. Starting with Star Wars Rebels, certain products will be co-branded with the Disney name, akin to what Disney has done with Pixar. On December 4, 2012, the Disney-Lucasfilm merger was approved by the Federal Trade Commission, allowing the acquisition to be finalized without dealing with antitrust problems. On December 18, 2012, Lucasfilm Ltd. converted from a corporation to a limited liability company, changing its name to Lucasfilm Ltd. LLC in the process,. On December 21, 2012, Disney completed the acquisition and Lucasfilm became a wholly owned subsidiary of Disney.

At the time of Disney's acquisition of Lucasfilm, 20th Century Fox, the original distributor of the first six Star Wars films, were to retain the physical and theatrical distribution rights to both the prequel trilogy and Episodes V and VI of the original trilogy until May 2020, along with full distribution rights for the original 1977 film in perpetuity. Lucasfilm retained the television and digital distribution rights to Star Wars Episodes I through VI with exception to Episode IV. On March 20, 2019, Disney officially acquired 20th Century after acquiring its owner, 21st Century Fox, thus consolidating all the distribution and ownership rights to all the films under its umbrella. In December 2013, Walt Disney Studios purchased the distribution and marketing rights to future Indiana Jones films from Paramount Pictures, although the latter studio would retain the distribution rights to the first four films and would receive "financial participation" from any additional films.

Kathleen Kennedy era, 2012–present
In early 2013, Iger confirmed that Lucasfilm planned to have standalone Star Wars films released during the six-year period the Sequel Trilogy was released. The first of these released was Rogue One (2016), and the second was Solo: A Star Wars Story (2018).

In April 2013, the video game development arm at LucasArts was closed down and most of its staff laid off. LucasArts remained open with a skeleton staff of fewer than ten employees so it could retain its function as a video game licensor. On May 6, 2013, Disney announced an exclusive deal with Electronic Arts (EA) to produce Star Wars games for the core gaming market for a decade. LucasArts retained the ability to license, and Disney Interactive Studios retained the ability to develop Star Wars games for the casual gaming market. On April 14, 2014, EA released its first Star Wars game under the Disney brand and their ten-year contract is set to expire on April 14, 2024.

On January 3, 2014, Lucasfilm announced that Dark Horse Comics' license for Star Wars comics would end in 2015, and return to fellow Disney subsidiary Marvel Comics. On April 24, 2014, Lucasfilm announced that the Star Wars Expanded Universe would be rebranded 'Legends' and no longer be canon and that only Lucas' episodic films and The Clone Wars would be considered canon in addition to new works, including the Rebels animated series, which would be overseen by a new story group. Disney Publishing Worldwide also announced that Del Rey would publish a new line of canon Star Wars books under the Lucasfilm story group being released starting in September on a bi-monthly schedule.

On January 16, 2014, Lucasfilm opened its Sandcrawler building on Fusionopolis View in Singapore as its regional headquarters with all staff moved from Changi Business Park. The Walt Disney Company Southeast Asia and ESPN Asia Pacific were also moved into the building. Between December 2015 and May 2018, Lucasfilm released four Star Wars cinematic films: Episode VII: The Force Awakens (December 18, 2015), Rogue One: A Star Wars Story (December 10, 2016), Episode VIII: The Last Jedi (December 9, 2017), and Solo: A Star Wars Story (May 10, 2018). While The Force Awakens, Rogue One, and The Last Jedi were both a critical and box office successes, Solo received mixed responses and underperformed at the box office.

In April 2017, IDW Publishing acquired a license to produce a range of all-ages Star Wars comics, commencing with Star Wars Adventures.

In mid-September 2018, Disney CEO Bob Iger stated in an interview with The Hollywood Reporter that there would be a "slow down" in the production of Star Wars films following the under-performance of Solo at the box office. In addition, Iger also confirmed that several Star Wars films including The Rise of Skywalker and David Benioff and D. B. Weiss' films were in development. Benioff and Weiss subsequently exited their film production deal with Lucasfilm in October 2019 after entering into a US$200 million film production deal with Netflix.

In late September 2018, Kennedy's contract as president was renewed for three additional years and was set to retire on October 30, 2021. In June 2019, Michelle Rejwan was named as senior vice president of live-action development and production. On December 20, 2019, Lucasfilm released its fifth cinematic film The Rise of Skywalker, which wrapped up The Skywalker Saga and received mixed reception from fans and critics.

In addition to the cinematic films, Lucasfilm Animation also produced several animated television shows including Star Wars Rebels (2014–2018), Star Wars Forces of Destiny (2017–2018), and Star Wars Resistance (2018–2020). In October 2018, Lucasfilm commenced work on a live-action streaming series called The Mandalorian with Jon Favreau, Dave Filoni, Kathleen Kennedy, and Colin Wilson serving as executive producers. Premiering on the Disney+ streaming service on November 12, 2019, the series received critical acclaim and was renewed for a second season.

In late February 2020, Lucasfilm launched a multimedia publishing project called Star Wars: The High Republic, which is set 200 years before the events of The Phantom Menace and features the Jedi at the height of their power. The High Republic involved several authors including Claudia Gray, Justina Ireland, Daniel José Older, Cavan Scott and Charles Soule.

During Disney Investor Day's conference in December 2020, Kennedy announced that Lucasfilm would be producing several new films and television shows including a Rogue Squadron movie directed by Patty Jenkins, an untitled film directed by Taika Waititi, the Ahsoka, Rangers of the New Republic, Andor, Obi-Wan Kenobi and The Acolyte live-action Disney+ streaming series, the animated Star Wars: The Bad Batch and anime Star Wars: Visions Disney+ streaming series.  In addition, Lucasfilm announced that it was working on a sequel to the 1988 fantasy film Willow and an adaptation of Tomi Adeyemi's young adult novel Children of Blood and Bone.

In the summer of 2020, Lucasfilm quietly promoted Dave Filoni as executive producer and executive creative director for the studio. However, his promotion was never announced to the public until Lucasfilm updated its list of executives on its website with the addition of Filoni in May 2021.

In mid-November 2021, Dark Horse Comics announced that it would be collaborating with Lucasfilm and Disney Publishing Worldwide to publish a new line of all-ages Star Wars comics and graphic novels. Dark Horse had previously held the licensing rights for producing Star Wars comics between 1991 and 2015.

In January 2022, Paramount Pictures acquired the rights to Adeyemi's Children of Blood and Bone from Lucasfilm. According to The Hollywood Reporter, Adeyemi had grown dissatisfied with the pace of Lucasfilm's production efforts and their decision to deny her request to serve as scriptwriter. Since Lucasfilm wanted to focus on its own intellectual properties Star Wars, Willow and Indiana Jones, the company allowed the rights to Children of Blood and Bone to lapse in late 2021.

In mid-September 2022, Lucasfilm confirmed release dates for several television series including Andor, Willow, the second season of Star Wars: The Bad Batch, and the third season of The Mandalorian at the D23 expo. In addition, Lucasfilm confirmed that it was working on several new productions including the animated series Tales of the Jedi, the live-action series Star Wars: Skeleton Crew, a fifth Indiana Jones film, and the animated series Young Jedi Adventures.

In November 2022, Studio Ghibli teased a collaboration with Lucasfilm on Twitter. This was then promptly revealed to be Zen - Grogu and Dust Bunnies, an animated short film set in the Star Wars universe, to be released on Disney+.

Company structure
 Industrial Light & Magic – visual effects
 Lucas Studio – visual effects
 ILM Singapore, ILM Vancouver, ILM London, ILM Sydney
 ILMxLAB
 Skywalker Sound – post-production sound design
 Lucasfilm Games – video games
 Lucasfilm Animation – animation
 Lucas Licensing – licensing and merchandising
 Lucas Books – book publishing imprint of Del Rey Books, licensed from Lucasfilm.
 Lucasfilm Story Group (2012–) The first two revealed members were Pablo Hidalgo and Leland Chee, headed by Kiri Hart as Lucasfilm's SVP, Development.

Former divisions
Former subsidiaries of Lucasfilm are:

Filmography

Franchises

Feature films

Released

Upcoming

Unspecified films with years
These films are unspecified but have confirmed years from The Walt Disney Studios.

Series

Animated series

Live-action series

Unscripted series
 Words with Warwick (2013) (as The Star Wars Corporation)
 The Star Wars Show (2016–present)
 Star Wars: Galaxy of Adventures Fun Facts (2018–2020)
 Our Star Wars Stories (2018–2020)
 Let's Make Star Wars (2019–present)
 Let's Draw Star Wars (2019–present)
 This Week! in Star Wars (2019–present)
 Star Wars: Jedi Temple Challenge (2020)

Attractions
 Captain EO (1986)
 Star Tours (1987)
 ExtraTERRORestrial Alien Encounter (1994)
 Indiana Jones Adventure: Temple of the Forbidden Eye (1995)
 Star Tours: The Adventures Continue (2011)
 Star Wars: Path of the Jedi (2015)

Documentaries, television films, specials & other productions

 Filmmaker (1968, documentary short) (directed by George Lucas) (nominal credit)
 The Making of 'Star Wars' (1977) (as The Star Wars Corporation) (produced in association with 20th Century Fox Television)
 Star Wars Holiday Special (1978) (as The Star Wars Corporation)
 SP FX: The Empire Strikes Back (1980)
 The Making of 'Raiders of the Lost Ark (1981) (produced in association with 20th Century Fox Television)
 Return of the Ewok (1982)
 Classic Creatures: Return of the Jedi (1983) (produced in association with 20th Century Fox Television)
 From 'Star Wars' to 'Jedi': The Making of a Saga (1983) (produced in association with 20th Century Fox Television)
 Caravan of Courage: An Ewok Adventure (1984)
 The Adventures of Andre & Wally B. (1984, animated short)
 The Making of 'Indiana Jones and the Temple of Doom (1985)
 Ewoks: The Battle for Endor (1985)
 The Great Heep (1986)
 Captain EO Promo & Pre-show (1986)
 Captain EO (1986)
 The Making of "Captain Eo" (1986)
 Wow!  (1990)
 Rush Rush (1991, music video by Paula Abdul)
 Defenders of Dynatron City (1992) (produced by DIC Entertainment in association with LucasArts)
 The Adventures of Young Indiana Jones
 The Adventures of Young Indiana Jones: Hollywood Follies (1994)
 The Adventures of Young Indiana Jones: Treasure of the Peacock's Eye (1995)
 The Adventures of Young Indiana Jones: Attack of the Hawkmen (1995)
 The Adventures of Young Indiana Jones: Travels with Fathers (1996)
 The Adventures of Young Indiana Jones Documentaries (2007–2008)
 The Phantom Menace: Web Documentaries (1998–1999) (Distributor)
 Star Wars: Starfighter, the Making of the Game (2001)
 R2-D2: Beneath the Dome (2001)
 The Beginning: Making 'Episode I (2001, for The Phantom Menace DVD edition)
 Films Are Not Released, They Escape (2002, for Attack of the Clones DVD edition)
 From Puppets to Pixels: Digital Characters in 'Episode II (2002, for Attack of the Clones DVD edition)
 State of the Art: The Pre-Visualization of 'Episode II''' (2002, for Attack of the Clones DVD edition)
 Star Wars: Connections (2002)
 Films Are Not Released, They Escape (2002)
 From Puppets to Pixels: Digital Characters in "Episode II" (2002)
 State of the Art: The Pre-Visualization of "Episode II" (2002)
 Empire of Dreams: The Story of the 'Star Wars' Trilogy (2004, for Original Trilogy DVD edition) (produced by Prometheus Entertainment in association with Fox Television Studios)
 The Birth of the Lightsaber  (2004, for Original Trilogy DVD edition)
 The Characters of 'Star Wars (2004, for Original Trilogy DVD edition)
 The Force Is with Them: The Legacy of 'Star Wars  (2004, for Original Trilogy DVD edition)
 Making the Game: 'Star Wars: Episode III – Revenge of the Sith' (2004, for Original Trilogy DVD edition)
 The Story of Star Wars (2004, for Original Trilogy DVD edition)
 Star Wars Episode III: Becoming Obi-Wan (2005, for Revenge of the Sith DVD edition)
 Clone Wars: Bridging the Saga (2005, for Clone Wars: Tom I DVD edition)
 Star Wars Episode III: Seduction Spot (2005)
 Star Wars: A Musical Journey (2005, musical anthology for Revenge of the Sith DVD edition)
 Within a Minute: The Making of 'Episode III (2005, for Revenge of the Sith DVD edition)
 The Chosen One (2005, for  Revenge of the Sith DVD edition)
 It's All for Real: The Stunts of Episode III (2005, for  Revenge of the Sith DVD edition)
 Star Wars Heroes & Villains (2005, for Revenge of the Sith DVD edition)
 Clone Wars: Connecting the Dots (2005,  for Clone Wars: Tom II DVD edition)
 Science of Star Wars (2005, produced in association with Evergreen Films)
 Revenge of the Sith: Web Documentaries (2005)
 Lego Star Wars:
 Lego Star Wars: Revenge of the Brick (2005)
 Lego Star Wars: The Quest for R2-D2 (2009)
 Lego Star Wars: Bombad Bounty (2010)
 Lego Star Wars: The Padawan Menace (2011)
 Lego Star Wars: The Empire Strikes Out (2012)
 The Lego Star Wars Holiday Special (2020)
 LEGO Star Wars: Terrifying Tales (2021)
 Lego Star Wars: Summer Vacation (2022)
 Star Wars: The Legacy Revealed (2007) (produced by Prometheus Entertainment in association with The History Channel)
 Star Wars Tech (2007) (distributor)
 Star Wars at 30 (2007) (Distributor)
 Robot Chicken: Star Wars (2007)
 You Can Draw 'Star Wars (2007, documentary produced in association with Dorling Kindersley Vision)
 The Fan Film (2007) (Distributor)
 Star Wars: Star Warriors (2007,) (Distributor)
 Spike TV segments: The Force Unleashed (2008)
 Star Wars: The Clone Wars Preview Special (2008)
 Robot Chicken: Star Wars Episode II (2008)
 A New Chapter: The Story of 'The Force Unleashed (2008)
 Warrior Make-up (2008 for The Kingdom of the Crystal Skull DVD edition)
 Lego Indiana Jones and the Raiders of the Lost Brick (2008)
 Indiana Jones and the Ultimate Quest (2008) (distributor)
 Unleashing the Tech: The Power Behind the Force (2008)
 The TFU Experience: Unleashing the Force on Your Favorite Console (2008)
 Unleashing the Force, Part 1: The New Beginning (2008) (Also distributor)
 Star Wars: The Clone Wars Preview Special (2008)
 A Force Wrecking Ball, Part 2: The Characters of "The Force Unleashed" (2008)
 The Star Wars Comic-Con 09 Spectacular (2009)
 The Making of Star Wars: In Concert (2009)
 Robot Chicken: Star Wars Episode III (2010)
 Star Wars: The Complete Saga (2011)
 Star Wars: Deleted Scenes (in first six episodes) (2011, Blu-ray bonus)
 On Set with 'Raiders of the Lost Ark''' (2012, for Indiana Jones films Blu-ray edition)
 Manifest Destiny (2012)
 Double Victory: The Tuskegee Airmen at War (2012)
 Transmission CVI: August 23, 2012 (2012)
 Double Victory: The Tuskegee Airmen at War (2012)
 Transmission CVI: August 23, 2012  (2012)
 Forceclash (2012)
 Kathleen Kennedy 2013 Pioneer of the Year Award Tribute Reel (2013)
 Clash at the Cantina (2014)
 Rebels Recon (2014–2018)
 Star Wars: Episode VII—Toys (2015)
 Star Wars: Launch Bay—Meet the Makers (2015)
 Star Wars: The Force Awakens World Premiere Red Carpet (2015)
 Star Wars Celebration streams (2015–present)
 Star Wars Celebration Live Anaheim 2015 stream
 The Star Wars Show LIVE! Celebration Europe 2016 stream
 The Star Wars Show LIVE! Celebration Orlando 2017 stream
 RiffTrax: Star Wars: The Force Awakens (2016)
 Daisy Ridley Exclusive Q&A (2016)
 Rogue One: A Star Wars Story – World Premiere (2016)
 Rogue One: Recon—A Star Wars 360 Experience (2016)
 Rogue One: A Star Wars Story—World Premiere (2016)
 Daisy Ridley Exclusive Q&A (2016)
 Science and Star Wars (2017)
 Live from the Red Carpet of Star Wars: The Last Jedi (2017)
 Live from the Red Carpet of Solo: A Star Wars Story! (2018)
 The Director and the Jedi (2018)
 RiffTrax: Star Wars: The Last Jedi (2018)
 Reflections (2018)
 Come Behind the Scenes of 'Star Wars: The Rise of Skywalker (2019)
 The Skywalker Legacy (2020)
 Star Wars: Squadrons - Hunted (2020)
 Disney Gallery: Star Wars: The Mandalorian (2020)
 Star Wars Galaxy of Sounds (2021)
 Under the Helmet: The Legacy of Boba Fett (2021)
 Star Wars: Biomes (2021)
 More than Robots (2022)
 Disney Gallery: The Book of Boba Fett (2022)
 Obi-Wan Kenobi: A Jedi’s Return (2022)
 Light & Magic (2022)
 Willow: Behind The Magic (2023)
 Zen - Grogu and Dust Bunnies (2022, co-produced with Studio Ghibli)
 Star Wars: A Droid Story (TBA)

References

External links 
 
 

 
Disney production studios
Film production companies of the United States
George Lucas
Entertainment companies based in California
Cinema of the San Francisco Bay Area
Companies based in San Francisco
American companies established in 1971
Mass media companies established in 1971
1971 establishments in California
Walt Disney Studios (division)
Disney acquisitions
2012 mergers and acquisitions
Lucasfilm
American corporate subsidiaries